The term isotonic may refer to:
Isotonic (exercise physiology), a type of muscle contraction
Isotonic regression, a type of numerical analysis
Isotonic, one of three types of tonicity that characterize a solution's concentration; see Tonicity#Isotonicity
A sports drink that contains similar concentrations of salt and sugar to the human body

ca:Isotònic